Shelest (Cyrillic: Шелест) or Szelest is a gender-neutral Slavic surname. It may refer to:
Petro Shelest (1908–1996), Ukrainian statesman
Anatoli Shelest (born 1955), Russian football coach and a former player
Oleksiy Shelest (born 1973), Ukrainian race walker
Taras Shelest (born 1980), Russian football player, son of Anatoli
Stan Szelest (1942–1991), American musician

See also
 

Ukrainian-language surnames